National Central Library may refer to:
 National Central Library, in Taipei, the national library of the Republic of China
 National Central Library (Florence), in Italy
 National Central Library (Rome), in Italy
 National Central Library (England and Wales), in London, England

See also 
 National library